Kerrod Holland (born 25 September 1992) is a Former Australian professional rugby league footballer who played as a er and  for the Canterbury-Bankstown Bulldogs in the NRL.

Background
Holland was born in Singleton, New South Wales, Australia.

He played his junior rugby league for the Singleton Greyhounds, before joining the Cessnock Goannas in the Newcastle Rugby League.

Playing career

Early career
As a 16-year-old, Holland trained with the Newcastle Knights' S. G. Ball Cup team, but decided to finish his electrical apprenticeship instead. After making his name with the Singleton Greyhounds as a halfback, he joined the Cessnock Goannas of the Newcastle Rugby League in 2014, transitioning to fullback and playing in the 2014 Grand Final against the Western Suburbs Rosellas. At the end of the season, he received a call from the new coach of the Newcastle Knights' New South Wales Cup team, Matt Lantry, asking him to train with the side for the 2015 season. Holland went on to play for the Knights in the New South Wales Cup, scoring 18 tries in 16 games, and played at centre in their 2015 New South Wales Cup Grand Final win over the Wyong Roos on 27 September 2015. On the same day, he was named at centre in the 2015 New South Wales Cup Team of the Year. On 3 November 2015, he signed a 2-year contract with the Canterbury-Bankstown Bulldogs starting in 2016.

2016
In round 2 of the 2016 NRL season, Holland made his NRL debut for Canterbury against the Penrith Panthers. After the scores were locked up at 16-all in the last minute of the game from a Moses Mbye try, Holland kicked the conversion after the full-time siren to win the match.

2017
In June, Holland re-signed with Canterbury on a 3-year contract until the end of 2020.

2018
Holland made 20 appearances for Canterbury in 2018 as the club finished in 12th place on the table.  At one point, the club were coming last until a late season surge including upset wins over Brisbane, New Zealand and a 38-0 victory over St George saved them from the wooden spoon.

2019
Holland played 14 games for Canterbury in the 2019 NRL season as they finished in 12th position.  By the midway point in the year, Canterbury-Bankstown found themselves sitting last on the table and in real danger of finishing with the wooden spoon.  However, for the third straight season, Canterbury achieved four upset victories in a row over Penrith, the Wests Tigers, South Sydney and Parramatta who were all competing for a place in the finals series and were higher on the table.

2020
On 1 September, Holland announced he was retiring from rugby league at the end of the 2020 NRL season after not being offered a new contract by Canterbury-Bankstown.

References

External links

Canterbury Bulldogs profile
Canterbury-Bankstown Bulldogs profile

1992 births
Living people
Australian rugby league players
Canterbury-Bankstown Bulldogs players
Cessnock Goannas players
Rugby league centres
Rugby league wingers
Rugby league players from New South Wales